This page is a glossary of beekeeping.

A
 Africanized bee – a hybrid bee with characteristics unsuitable for beekeeping
 Apiary – a yard where beehives are kept
 Apicology – ecology of bees
 Apiology – scientific study of bees
 Apitherapy – a branch of alternative medicine that uses honey bee products including honey, pollen, propolis, royal jelly and bee venom.

B
 Bee – a member of the order that includes ants and wasps
 Bee anatomy (mouth)
 Bee bread – the main source of food for most honey bees and their larvae
 Beekeeper – also called apiarist or apiculturist, a person who cares for bees
 Bee learning and communication
 Bee museums
 Bee sting
 Bee venom therapy – also called apitherapy
 Beehive – a housing for cavity-dwelling bees that allows inspection and honey removal
 Beekeeping – bees are kept for their products (principally honey), and their utility in pollinating crops
 Bees and toxic chemicals
 Brood (honey bee) – the egg, larval, and pupal form of the bee and the comb in which they develop
 Buckfast bee – a productive breed of bee suitable for damp and cloudy climes

C
 Carniolan honey bee – a gentle bee good for variable nectar flow 
 Characteristics of common wasps and bees
 Colony Collapse Disorder – malady of unknown cause characterized by disappearance of bees from hive

D
 Deseret – the beehive and its symbolism to the Church of Jesus Christ of Latter-day Saints (Mormons)
 Diseases of the honey bee 
 Drone bee – the male bee
 Drone laying queen

H
 Honey bee – all the species in the genus Apis
 Honey bee life cycle – the physical stages in the development of a mature bee starting from the egg

I
 Italian bee – the most well known honey bee subspecies

L
 Laying worker bee – this worker will produce only drone bees
 Langstroth hive – commonly seen in developed countries as stacks of white or muted colored boxes at the edges of fields and orchards

N
 Northern Nectar Sources for Honey Bees – common names and descriptions of northern latitude nectar plants

P
 Pesticide toxicity to bees
 Piping queen – queens will make audible sounds at certain times
 Pollinator decline – loss of bees and other pollinators is an environmental issue

Q
 Queen bee – a single egg laying bee capable of producing workers, drones, and queens

R
 Honey bee race
 Russian honey bee

S
 Stingless bees  – Trigona and Melipona bees kept from ancient times in Central America and Australia
 Swarming – the means by which bee colonies propagate

T
 Top-bar hive – an alternative to the Langstroth box hive, with some advantages for casual beekeeping

V
 Virgin queen – a queen that has not yet bred with drones

W
 Western honey bee – European honey bees
 Worker bee – the many tasks performed by this class of bee during her short lifetime and her specialized single-use stinger

See also
 List of honey plants

 
Beekeeping
Wikipedia glossaries using unordered lists